Matthew Prentice (born 23 September 1980) is a New Zealand former professional tennis player.

A native of Wellington, Prentice played collegiate tennis in the United States for Oklahoma State University.

Prentice made an ATP Tour main draw appearance in doubles at the 2004 Heineken Open and won two ITF Futures doubles titles during his career. In 2004 and 2005 he was a playing member of the New Zealand Davis Cup team.

ITF Futures titles

Doubles: (2)

See also
List of New Zealand Davis Cup team representatives

References

External links
 
 
 

1980 births
Living people
New Zealand male tennis players
Oklahoma State Cowboys tennis players
Sportspeople from Wellington City